Edward Denison may refer to:
Edward Denison (philanthropist) (1840–1870), English philanthropist and politician
Edward Denison (bishop) (1801–1854), English bishop 
Edward E. Denison (1873–1953), American congressman
Edward Fulton Denison (1915–1992), American economist